Titoff (born Christophe Junca; 18 July 1972) is a French humorist and actor.

Filmography

On Stage

One Man Show
 2000: Titoff à l'Olympia
 2003: Titoff au Casino de Paris
 2004: Titoff au Palais des Glaces
 2007: Métrosexuel
 2012: Déjà de retour
 2014: 15 ans de scène

Theater

Other 
In 2013, he was a contestant during the Fourth season of Danse avec les stars.

References

External links

 

Living people
1972 births
French male film actors
French male television actors
21st-century French male actors
Male actors from Marseille